FAST kinase domain-containing protein 3 (FASTKD3) is a protein that in humans is encoded by the FASTKD3 gene on chromosome 5. This protein is part of the Fas-activated serine/threonine kinase domain (FASTKD) containing protein family, which is known for regulating the energy balance of mitochondria under stress.

Structure 

FASTKD3 shares structural characteristics of the FASTKD family, including an N-terminal mitochondrial targeting domain and three C-terminal domains: two FAST kinase-like domains (FAST_1 and FAST_2) and a RNA-binding domain (RAP). The mitochondrial  targeting domain directs FASTKD3 to be imported into the mitochondria. Though the functions of the C-terminal domains are unknown, RAP possibly binds RNA during trans-splicing.

Function 

As a member of the FASTKD family, FASTKD3 localizes to the mitochondria to modulate their energy balance, especially under conditions of stress. Though ubiquitously expressed in all tissues, FASTKD3 appears more abundantly in skeletal muscle, heart muscle, and other tissues enriched in mitochondria. FASTKD3 has been proposed to regulate energy production by serving as a scaffold protein that brings together RNA processing/translation and respiratory components.

Clinical Significance 

Currently, FASTKD3 has not been linked to any disease. (Dated: September 17, 2015)

Interactions 

FASTKD3 has been shown to interact with:
FASTKD2; 
Fatty acid beta oxidation pathway proteins (ACADVL, ECHS1, HADHA, HADHB, ACAA2);
Amino acid catabolic pathways proteins (MCCC1, MCCC2, GLUD1, HIBADH, CPS1); 
Amino acid biosynthesis proteins (PYCR1, PYCR2, ALDH18A1, SHMT2, GLS);
TCA cycle proteins (IDH3A, IDH2, SUCLG2, DLST);
Respiratory chain proteins (NDUFS1, SDHA, ATP5A1, ETFA, ETFB);
Mitochondrial RNA processing proteins (LRPPRC, DHX30, PNPT1); and
Mitochondrial translation proteins (TUFM, GFM1, IARS2, MRPS22, TARS2, MRPS2, PTCD1, MTO1, MRPS31).

References

Further reading 

 
 

Genes
Human proteins